Azeem Amrohi 
(), was an Urdu poet and a scholar. Amrohi started writing poetry early in his life and has written almost every form of Urdu poetry, including Hamd, na`at, nazm, ghazal, qasida, salaam and manqabat). He is most famous for his book Marsiya Nigaraan e Amroha. He wrote almost 30 Marsiyas. He was awarded Meer Taqi Meer award in 1993.

Early life and education
Azeem Amrohvi was born on 29 April 1945, in Amroha, Uttar Pradesh to a very religious family. He was the first child of Noor Ul Hasan and Raziya Bano. He lost his mother as an infant and was raised by his grandmother. He completed his B.Com. from Lucknow University and started working in Food Corporation of India while continuing his education. Then he completed many degree courses in Urdu like Adeeb, Kamil, Dabeer, Fazil and completed his M.A in Urdu. He started his PhD when he had already published eight books.

Career
He wrote his first marsiya at 24. His works describing his travels in Iran received the book of the year award by the Urdu Academy of Delhi. The Iranian Government published six of his books. He is the only Urdu writer who wrote a book on Ruhollah Khomeini in poetry form.

Death
Azeem Amrohvi died from heart attack on 10 October 2020. He had heart disease for the last 15 years prior to his death.

Bibliography
 Hadees e gham
 Hussain aur zindagi
 Tehreek e nenawa
 Sherh e gham
 marsiya e azeem
 Hussainyat ek aafaaqi tehreek
 Marsiya Nigaraan e Amroha
 Bain ul aqwaami muharram number
 Qur'an aur Hussain
 Rasool e Azam
 Ittehaad e Islami
 Mulaqqat e Imam
 Mufassir e noor
 Mere khwabo ka jahan
 Khandan e Shameem ki marsiya goyi
 Naqsh e heyat
 Aaftab e Inqalab
 Tawaaf e noor
 Shameem E shukhan
 Rasooliyaat
 Shamime e Aqidat
 Shamime Atash
 Hilal e Gham (Hindi)
 Hilal e Gham 2 (Hindi)
 Marasiye Azeem
 Miraaj e Sukhan
 ishq e Azeem

References

External links

1945 births
2020 deaths
People from Amroha
Urdu-language poets